Jordan Grant (born 22 March 1991) is a New Zealand field hockey player. She has competed for the New Zealand women's national field hockey team (the Black Sticks Women) since 2014, including at the 2014 Commonwealth Games.

References

1991 births
Living people
New Zealand female field hockey players
Field hockey players at the 2014 Commonwealth Games
Commonwealth Games bronze medallists for New Zealand
Commonwealth Games medallists in field hockey
20th-century New Zealand women
21st-century New Zealand women
Medallists at the 2014 Commonwealth Games